Stéphane Morisot (born January 11, 1978 in Langres, France) is a former French football defender.

Morisot's previous clubs include FC Metz, Troyes AC, CS Sedan Ardennes, Dijon FCO and FC Rouen.

External links

1978 births
Living people
People from Langres
French footballers
FC Metz players
ES Troyes AC players
CS Sedan Ardennes players
Chamois Niortais F.C. players
Dijon FCO players
FC Rouen players
Ligue 2 players
Championnat National players
Association football defenders
Sportspeople from Haute-Marne
Footballers from Grand Est